WBNS-FM (97.1 MHz) – branded 97.1 The Fan – is a commercial sports radio station licensed to serve Columbus, Ohio, and services the Columbus metropolitan area. Owned by Tegna Inc., it and WBNS (1460 AM) are the only two radio stations currently owned by Tegna; the studios for both stations are co-located with WBNS-TV (channel 10) on Twin Rivers Drive west of Downtown Columbus, adjacent to WBNS-FM's transmitter tower.

WBNS-FM is the FM flagship for the Ohio State Sports Network, the Columbus Blue Jackets Radio Network, and the Columbus Crew, and the market affiliate for the Cleveland Browns Radio Network, the NFL on Westwood One Sports and ESPN Radio, the latter in a shared affiliation with WBNS (AM). In addition to a standard analog transmission, WBNS-FM is also available online.

History

Previous stations

WBNS's sister station, WBNS (AM 1460), was established in 1922, and in 1929 was acquired by the Wolfe Family, which also owned the major daily newspaper, The Columbus Dispatch.  WBNS experimented with FM broadcasts as early as 1940 with experimental station W8XVH, which in 1941 became commercial station W45CM, and later WELD.  But few people owned FM receivers in those days, so management suspended operations in July 1953, and WELD was formally deleted on July 14, 1953.

Founding and beautiful music
WBNS-FM signed on in 1957, on the same frequency, 97.1 MHz, previously used by WELD. At first it largely simulcast the AM station.

In 1970 it began airing a beautiful music format, playing quarter-hour sweeps of instrumental cover versions of popular songs, Broadway and Hollywood show tunes.  In the 1980s, the station began playing more soft adult contemporary vocals, in an effort to appeal to a younger audience.

Oldies and AC
In November 1991 the station moved from easy listening, to oldies, calling itself "Oldies B-97.1".  The playlist was made up of Top 40 hits of the 1960s and 70s.  Almost ten years later, in July 2001, WBNS-FM moved to modern AC as "The New 97.1", with a mix of pop alternative music.

Eventually, the station evolved with a hot AC format as "97.1-More Music, More Variety."  In August 2005, the station began using the "Mix" name and became "Mix 97.1-80s, 90s, Now."  Meanwhile, co-owned WBNS 1460 AM had good ratings as an all-sports AM station, as more cities were getting FM sports outlets.  Management decided to capitalize on its sports franchise.

Sports format
On January 26, 2009, at 2 PM, WBNS-FM began a simulcast of AM sister station WBNS "1460 The Fan."  WBNS-FM became "97.1 The Fan."  The final song played on Mix 97.1 was "Leave Out All The Rest" by Linkin Park.

On June 11, 2019, The Columbus Dispatch announced it was selling its broadcasting assets, including WBNS-AM-FM-TV, to Tegna Inc., for $535 million in cash. The deal was expected to close in the third quarter of 2019, pending Federal Communications Commission approval. The sale was completed on August 8.

Over time, WBNS-FM became the exclusive home of local Columbus-based sports shows, while WBNS 1460 AM airs the national ESPN Radio Network feed.

References

External links
97.1 The Fan

 FCC History Cards for WBNS-FM (covering 1957-1980)

Tegna Inc.
BNS-FM
Sports radio stations in the United States
Radio stations established in 1957
1957 establishments in Ohio
ESPN Radio stations